Comet is an unincorporated community in Green Township, Summit County, Ohio, United States.

The Comet Post Office was established on May 23, 1883, and discontinued on July 31, 1903. Mail service is now handled through the Clinton branch.

References 

Unincorporated communities in Summit County, Ohio